The Journal of Cardiothoracic Surgery is an open access, peer-reviewed online journal that encompasses all aspects of research in cardiothoracic surgery.

References

1) Editorial Board: https://cardiothoracicsurgery.biomedcentral.com/about/editorial-board

2) Instruction for Authors: https://www.biomedcentral.com/about/foreditors

External links
 

Surgery journals
Thoracic surgery
Cardiac surgery
BioMed Central academic journals
Publications established in 2006
English-language journals
Creative Commons Attribution-licensed journals